The seventeenth series of Ballando con le Stelle is currently broadcasting from 8 October 2022 to 23 December 2022 on RAI 1 and is presented by Milly Carlucci with Paolo Belli and his Big Band.

Couples

Scoring chart

Red numbers indicate the lowest score for each week.
Green numbers indicate the highest score for each week.
 indicates the couple eliminated that week.
 indicates the returning couples that finished in the bottom two/three was saved by a second public vote.
 indicates the returning couples that finished in the top position and received a bonus for the next week.
 indicates the returning couples that finished in the bottom position and received a malus for the next week.
 indicates the returning couple that received a bonus.
 indicates the couple who quit the competition.
 indicates the couple who was ejected from the competition.
 indicates the couple was voted back into the competition.
 indicates the couple was eliminated but was voted back into the competition by "safe-conduct".
 indicates the couple was voted back into the competition but then re-eliminated.
 indicates the winning couple.
 indicates the runner-up couple.
 indicates the third-place couple.

Notes

17
2022 Italian television seasons